Melicytus ramiflorus (māhoe or whiteywood) is a small tree of the family Violaceae endemic to New Zealand.

It grows up to 10 metres high with a trunk up to 60 cm in diameter, it has smooth, whitish bark and brittle twigs. The dark-green "alternate" leaves are 5–15 cm long and 3–5 cm wide and their edges are finely serrated (although this feature is less pronounced in younger plants).The plants are dioecious and the small flowers are yellowish in colouration, between 3 and 4 mm in diameter and occur in fascicles, growing straight out from naked twigs- these flowers have a strong, pleasant fragrance. The berries are a striking violet colour when ripe and are more or less spherical with a diameter of between 3 and 4 mm. Flowering occurs in late spring ( southern hemisphere )- and on into summer while the berries appear later on in summer and also in autumn.

The berries of M. ramiflorus are eaten by a number of native birds, including kererū and tui, while geckos of the genus Naultinus have also been observed to supplement their primarily insectivorous diet with consumption of these berries.
It is also a host species for the caterpillars of the New Zealand endemic moth Austramathes purpurea.
It is ubiquitous throughout lower altitude New Zealand forests and is frequently seen in areas of regenerating forest.

Subspecies
In former analyses, four subspecies of M. ramiflorus were recognised: subsp. ramiflorus of New Zealand, subsp. oblongifolius of Norfolk Island, subsp. fastigiata of Fiji and subsp. samoensis of Samoa and Tonga. More recent studies, especially that by Art Whistler, have indicated that all these subspecies should be regarded as species in their own right.

References 

L. Cockyane and E. Phillips Turner, 1943, The Trees of New Zealand. Government Printer.
John Dawson and Rob Lucas, 2000, Nature Guide to the New Zealand Forest. Godwit.
Donald R. Drake, Walter A. Whistler, Timothy J. Motley, and Clyde T. Imada, 1996, Rain Forest Vegetation of 'Eua Island, Kingdom of Tonga. New Zealand Journal of Botany, 1996, Vol. 34: 65–77.
A.L. Poole and N.M. Adams, 1963, Trees and Shrubs of New Zealand. Government Printer.

External links

  New Zealand Plant Conservation Network, URL: Melicytus ramiflorus, retrieved 3 October 2010.

ramiflorus
Trees of New Zealand
Dioecious plants